Fireside Theatre (also known as Jane Wyman Presents) is an American anthology drama series that ran on NBC from 1949 to 1958, and was the first successful filmed series on American television. Productions were low-budget and often based on public domain stories or written by freelance writers such as Rod Serling. While it was panned by critics, it remained in the top ten most popular shows for most of its run. It predated the other major pioneer of filmed TV in America, I Love Lucy, by two years.

Overview

Fireside Theatre was created by Frank Wisbar, who also wrote and directed many episodes. From 1952 to 1958, the program was presented by a host. This role was first filled by Wisbar (1952–1953), then by Gene Raymond (1953–1955), and finally by the person most associated with the series in the public mind, Jane Wyman (1955–1958).  When episodes of this program were rerun on ABC during the summer of 1963, it was under the title Jane Wyman Presents; during the period first-run episodes were hosted by Wyman, the series was sometimes known as The Jane Wyman Show.

One of Fireside Theatre'''s most notable offerings was a 1951 condensed version of Charles Dickens's  A Christmas Carol, featuring Ralph Richardson as Ebenezer Scrooge for the only time on American television. He later recreated the role on a spoken word Caedmon Records LP album, with Paul Scofield as narrator. It has since been released on CD.

The Doubleday Book Club also ran a playscripts club called The Fireside Theatre.

Episodes

Cast
As an anthology series, Fireside Theatre had no regular cast, just a series of guest stars:

Claude Akins
Keith Andes
John Archer
Barry Atwater
Phyllis Avery
Parley Baer
Gene Barry
Frances Bavier
William Bendix
Richard Beymer
Whit Bissell
Gloria Blondell
Neville Brand
Frank Cady
Rod Cameron
Macdonald Carey
Jack Carson
Jeannie Carson
Anthony Caruso
George Chandler
Dane Clark
Gary Clarke
Imogene Coca
Hans Conried
Jeanne Cooper
Robert O. Cornthwaite
Joseph Cotten
Linda Darnell
John Dehner
Albert Dekker
Reginald Denny
Francis De Sales
Lawrence Dobkin
John Doucette
Paul Douglas
Stephen Dunne
Dan Duryea
Vince Edwards
Jack Elam
Richard Erdman
Bill Erwin
Felicia Farr
William Fawcett
Frank Ferguson
Joe Flynn
Bruce Gordon
Dabbs Greer
Virginia Gregg
Virginia Grey
Kevin Hagen
Don Haggerty
Charles Herbert
Louis Jean Heydt
William Hopper
Vivi Janiss
Carolyn Jones
Henry Jones
Gail Kobe
Jack Kruschen
Fernando Lamas
Charles Lane
John Larch
Peter Lawford
Peter Leeds
Yvonne Lime
Betty Lynn
Hugh Marlowe
Lee Marvin
Mercedes McCambridge
Jayne Meadows
Ralph Meeker
Gary Merrill
Eve Miller
George Montgomery
Dennis Morgan
Jeff Morrow
Don Murray
Burt Mustin
Jeanette Nolan
Margaret O'Brien
Doris Packer
Larry Pennell
Vincent Price
Maudie Prickett
Ainslie Pryor
Stuart Randall
Gilman Rankin
Lydia Reed
Addison Richards
Peter Mark Richman
Roy Roberts
Gilbert Roland
Ruth Roman
Herbert Rudley
Roberta Shore
Everett Sloane
Arthur Space
Aaron Spelling
Jan Sterling
Craig Stevens
Karl Swenson
Nita Talbot
Gloria Talbott
Tom Tryon
Ann Tyrrell
Minerva Urecal
Herb Vigran
Beverly Washburn
Jesse White
Frank Wilcox
Cara Williams
Marie Windsor
Fay Wray
Keenan Wynn

Reception

Critical responseBillboard magazine praised an episode titled "The Lottery", saying that the cast "all turned in taut, exciting performances to make Lottery a real winner". Unlike most episodes of the series, this episode aired live.

In 1954, Billboard voted it fourth-best filmed network drama series, ahead of the more fondly remembered General Electric Theater; however, Billboards list excluded "mystery" shows (which was a separate list topped by Dragnet).

RatingsFireside Theatre became a hit for NBC, always in the Top 30 shows at the end of each TV season, until the 1956–1957 season, when its ratings slumped. After this, it never again regained its top spot.

Seasonal rankings (based on average total viewers per episode) of Fireside Theatre on NBC. (Note: In the United States, each network television season starts in September and ends in late May, which coincides with the completion of May sweeps.)

 References 

Brooks, Tim and Marsh, Earle, The Complete Directory to Prime Time Network and Cable TV ShowsFurther reading
 Lafferty, William. "'No Attempt at Artiness, Profundity, or Significance': 'Fireside Theater' and the Rise of Filmed Television Programming." Cinema Journal'' (1987): 23–46 online.

External links 
Fireside Theatre at CVTA with episode list
  
Fireside Theatre at the Museum of Broadcast Communications

1949 American television series debuts
1958 American television series endings
1940s American anthology television series
1950s American anthology television series
American Broadcasting Company original programming
1940s American drama television series
1950s American drama television series
Black-and-white American television shows
English-language television shows
NBC original programming